Michael "Mike" Laurence Staines (born May 30, 1949) is an American rower who competed in the 1972 Summer Olympics and in the 1976 Summer Olympics.

He was born in Guildford, Great Britain. He is the ex-husband of Laura Staines.

In 1972 he was a crew member of the American boat which finished eleventh in the coxed pair event.

Four years later he and his partner Calvin Coffey won the silver medal in the coxless pairs competition.

References

External links
 profile

1949 births
Living people
American male rowers
Rowers at the 1972 Summer Olympics
Rowers at the 1976 Summer Olympics
Olympic silver medalists for the United States in rowing
Cornell University alumni
Medalists at the 1976 Summer Olympics